Southington station may refer to:

Southington station (GCRTA Blue Line), a station on Van Aken Boulevard in Shaker Heights, Ohio
Southington station (GCRTA Green Line), a station on Shaker Boulevard in Shaker Heights, Ohio